Linha de Vendas Novas is a freight railway line which connects the stations of Setil, on the Linha do Norte, and Vendas Novas, on the Linha do Alentejo, in Portugal. It was opened on 15 January 1904. This line also previously had a regional passenger service which operated until 2005, then again between 2009 and 2011. Passenger service on this line was discontinued due to low ridership.

See also 
 List of railway lines in Portugal
 History of rail transport in Portugal

References

Sources

Railway lines in Portugal
Railway lines opened in 1904
1904 establishments in Portugal
Iberian gauge railways